The following lists of princely states of (British) India have been compiled:

 List of princely states of British India (alphabetical)
 List of princely states of British India (by region)

British India
British India-related lists